Greg Autry (born April 25, 1963) is an American space policy expert, educator, entrepreneur and author. He is a Clinical Professor of Space Leadership, Business and Policy at the Thunderbird School of Global Management at Arizona State University. He serves as Chair of the Safety Working Group on the COMSTAC. He was an assistant professor of Clinical Entrepreneurship in Marshall School of Business at the University of Southern California. Prior to that, he served as an adjunct professor of strategy and entrepreneurship at the Merage School of Business at the University of California, Irvine. Autry served on the NASA Agency Review Team for the incoming Trump administration in 2016 and temporarily as the White House Liaison at NASA in 2017. He holds an MBA and PhD from the University of California, Irvine.

Education
Autry earned a BA in history from California Polytechnic University, Pomona in 1999 and an MBA from the Paul Merage School of Business at the University of California, Irvine in 2002. He earned a PhD from the same school in 2013. Autry's doctoral dissertation focused on the role of government in the emergence of new industries, using the emerging NewSpace or "commercial spaceflight" sector as a research context. Autry collected data from interviews with commercial space actors as well as information from industry journals and presentations at industry conferences. His analysis combined management, sociological, and policy models.

Career

Software and network engineer
While in high school, Autry founded H.A.L. Labs—not to be confused with the Japanese video game firm HAL Laboratory—an early computer video game developer and publisher, with Brian Fitzgerald in 1980. The firm's first product, Taxman, a PacMan look alike for the Apple II computer, was eventually purchased by Atari and released under the Atarisoft label.

From 1983 to 1984 Autry worked for Honeywell's Training and Control Systems Division in West Covina, California developing software for the production department in support of various military projects.

From 1984 to 1986 Autry developed medical device software for Hemascience Laboratories / Baxter Fenwal. He coded 6502 assembly for the Autopheresis C plasmapheresis system, a machine that extracts plasma and platelets from whole blood during donations. He also coded 8080 assembly for a robotic assembly system that produced the disposable filter kits for that device.

Autry founded Riverside Doctor Micro, Inc. in 1987 with Daniel Haste. Doctor Micro was a computer services and retail company; the firm was sold to CompuCom systems in 1994. Autry joined CompuCom as Technical Services Manager overseeing their branches in several Western US cities including Los Angeles and Orange County.

Autry founded Network Corps, a network engineering and software development firm, with Brian Bishop in 1997. Network Corps developed enterprise solutions in the clinical healthcare space for Kaiser Permanente. The firm ceased operations in 2014.

In 2015, Autry cofounded Elevated Materials; a startup launched by USC engineering student Ryan Olliges to upcycle scrap carbon fiber material from aerospace production.

Academic career

After earning his MBA at the University of California, Irvine, Autry joined the UCI faculty, teaching innovation, entrepreneurship, strategy, and macroeconomics as an adjunct lecturer from 2002 to 2014. In 2013 he also taught macroeconomics at Chapman University in Orange California.
 
Autry was hired as an adjunct professor in 2013 by the USC Marshall School of Business at the University of Southern California. The following year he joined the faculty as a full-time, assistant clinical professor of entrepreneurship. Autry left USC in July 2020 following the announcement of his nomination by the President to serve as the chief financial officer at the National Aeronautics and Space Administration (NASA).

Autry joined the Thunderbird School of Global Management in April 2021 as Clinical Professor of Space Leadership, Policy and Business. He is currently teaching and leading the development of a space initiative at ASU's new campus in downtown Los Angeles.

Autry also teaches space entrepreneurship in a Graduate Certificate Program in Commercial Space offered by International Space University and Florida Institute of Technology.

Autry is also a visiting professor at the Institute for Security Science and Technology at Imperial College London.

Publications and media appearances

Autry's first academic publication was a 2011 paper in the proceedings of the American Institute of Aeronautics and Astronautics SPACE 2011 conference entitled "Space Policy, Intergenerational Ethics and the Environment" which argued that public investment in space technology was justified by future economic, societal and environmental returns. Other notable academic publications include two pieces for the New Space Journal, a peer reviewed journal. He currently serves on the editorial board of that journal.

Autry published numerous articles and op-eds in newspapers and news sites throughout the 2000s and 2010s. Most of his writings were on the space business or China policy. His work has appeared in the San Francisco Chronicle, LA Times, Washington Times, and Newsweek. Recently he has been a frequent contributor at Forbes, Foreign Policy, and Space News.

Autry is also extensively quoted in mainstream media articles on the space industry and on China policy. His thoughts on these topics have been noted in the New York Times, Wall Street Journal, Politico, and the Washington Post. He has appeared on television many times including the BBC and CNN.

Autry's pieces and quotes often argue that public investment in NASA's traditional and commercial programs returns value to the taxpayer. He is an advocate for the human settlement of the Solar System. He asserts that this movement is required to secure continued global economic development and long-term environmental sustainability which he does not believe can be achieved via traditional "green" solutions. He serves as vice president for Space Development at the National Space Society and previously served on its board of directors.

Autry has also been a noted critic of the Chinese Communist Party for more than a decade arguing that the Chinese government has violated human rights, labor norms, environmental norms, treaty obligations, and trade agreements. In 2011, Autry published Death by China with Peter Navarro, a professor at UC Irvine with whom he had written many op-eds and articles. In 2012 he served as a producer on a documentary film of the same name, directed by Navarro and narrated by Martin Sheen.

Textbooks
Autry's first edition college textbook, The New Entrepreneurial Dynamic: 21st Century Startups and Small Businesses, was published in January 2022 by Flat World Knowledge Publishers. The book introduced the New Entrepreneurial Dynamic (NED) as a core adaptive model for business development. NED emphasizes adaptability and flexibility, building dynamic teams, planning for change, and developing alternative strategies. The book is written in a casual style that reflects the author's own entrepreneurial experiences.

Policy advocacy

Autry has twice testified to the United States Congress on China issues. On March 21, 2013, he presented testimony entitled "Cyber Attacks: An Unprecedented Threat to US National Security" to the House Foreign Affairs Subcommittee on Europe, Eurasia and Emerging Threats. Autry warned that China's Internet intrusions against US firms was costing the American economy hundreds of billions of dollars, jobs and in consequence of the hazard of unemployment, thousands of American lives lost. He compared the impact of these attacks to the September 11 attacks. Long before it became a controversial issue in many Western nations, he urged to removal of Huawei equipment from American telecommunications networks, stating, "We should have a ban on the import of any Chinese networking hardware, and specifically I mean Huawei".

On March 28, 2012, Autry presented testimony entitled "The Price of Public Diplomacy with China" to the House Foreign Affairs Subcommittee on Oversights and Investigations. In this testimony Autry warned of China's "perception management" campaign in the US designed to "legitimize" China's non-democratic system with the support of American collaborators in government, industry, and universities.

Autry also testified to the Senate Commerce, Science, and Transportation Committee at a nomination hearing on November 10, 2020. During his testimony Autry argued that public investment in space was justified. Autry noted the challenges of 2020 faced on Earth and reminded the committee that the Apollo landings occurred during a period of war, civil unrest, and even a major pandemic (the Hong Kong flu).

On February 3, 2022, Dr. Autry participated in the Oxford Union Society Space Race Debate as a proponent of the human habitation of Mars. The Oxford Union in the UK is the world's foremost debating society.

Governmental service
During the 2016–2017 presidential transition, Autry served on the Agency Review Team at NASA. These teams are tasked with evaluating government agencies and making policy recommendations to the incoming administration.

The team's recommendations formed the basis for the Trump space policy, which resulted in a series of budget increases for NASA, a commitment to returning to the Moon and has been widely regarded as expansive. Following his service on the transition team, Autry temporarily served as the White House Liaison at NASA.

President Trump nominated Dr. Autry to serve as the chief financial officer at NASA on July 27, 2020.

On December 2, the Senate Commerce, Science, and Transportation Committee voted 14–12 on party lines to forward his nomination to the full Senate. It was uncertain if the Senate would find time in the schedule for several 2020 nominees, including Autry, as their focus was on bills which included the passage of the National Defense Authorization Act and finalizing a 2021 omnibus spending bill. On January 3, 2021, his nomination was returned to the President under Rule XXXI, Paragraph 6 of the United States Senate.

Boards and non-profits

Autry served as an advisor to Relativity Space, a startup rocket manufacturer using additive manufacturing (3D printing) that raised over $1.2 billion. Autry has advised Relativity's founders since their time as students at USC. He also serves on the board of Interstellar Lab. He served on the board of the National Space Society from 2018 to 2020 and continues to serve as vice president for Space Development.

Autry was appointed to the Commercial Space Transportation Advisory Committee in 2018. The COMSTAC advises the Office of Commercial Space Transportation at the Federal Aviation Administration in the US Department of Transportation on matters affecting the space transportation industry. Autry was reappointed to the committee in 2020 and appointed as Chair of the Safety Working Group.

References

People associated with spaceflight
Public speaking
Space advocates
Living people
1963 births
California State Polytechnic University, Pomona alumni
University of California, Irvine alumni